Shwai is an ethnic group in Sudan. They speak Shwai, a Niger–Congo language. Many members of this ethnicity are Christians. The population of this ethnicity possibly exceeds 5,000. The origin of this ethnic group are the Nuba Mountains.

References
Joshua Project

Ethnic groups in Sudan